Sandayar Chit Swe (1935–2005) was a Burmese singer-songwriter and pianist. He is best known for his songs such as "Chit Arr Nge Ya Thu Mal", "Kha Yay Pin Aut Ka Padauk Chit Thu'", "Chit Thu Way Way Thwar Par Nae Lar", "Nge Chit Haung Nae Hnit Paung Myar Swar" and "Yay Lo Aye Tae Nway Lay Ta Nway".

Biography
Chit Swe was born on 5 June 1935 in Hinthada, Irrawaddy Division, British Burma to parents U Ba Hlaing, a pianist and Daw Kyin Sein. He was eldest of four siblings. At the night of Sandayar Chit Swe birth, his father (the band's leader) took film actor Ye Khaung Chit Swe's name and was named to Sandayar Chit Swe as 'Chit Swe' during Mya Khwar Nyo silent film by A1 Film was screening at the Sharf Cinema (later Tun Lin Cinema) in Hinthada.

He learned to play the piano from his father. He learned to play piano in the silent film from Pianist Nyunt Hlaing and Sagaing Hla Shwe. Music teachers of Sandayar Chit Swe were his father U Ba Hlaing, Treasurer of Hinthada U Su, Harp and pianist U Tun Pe. Sandayar Chit Swe played piano with his father when he was 10 years old at the cinema. He arrived to Rangoon in 1949 at the age of 14. There he studied music from Mr.Ben Hot and Khattara Aye.

Chit Swe then played the piano for the first time under the tutelage of musician Shwe Pyi Aye at the Win Win Theater. He then studied film music from guitarist U Ba Nyunt and pianist Sagaing Hla Shwe. In this way, he played piano at Thwin, King, Raj (Brave), Regent (pioneer), Jama, Lwin Lwin, Maw cinemas. He had the opportunity to study music from Au Aww Ba Thaung, Thaton Ba Thein, Paerock Ba Than, Than Pe, Saw Hlaing, Musician Ye Naung, Than Tin, Ko Ni, Sein Party, Hinthar Kyi, Daw Nu, Dagon Khin, Khin Khin Nyunt, Shwe Myaing Kyi. He played piano at Cho Tay Shin, Lay Hlaing Than and Tay Batemann orchestras.

Discography

References

Burmese composers
People from Ayeyarwady Region
1935 births
2005 deaths
20th-century Burmese male singers
20th-century composers
Living people